Alexander Nazarov (25 May 1925 – 7 February 1945) was a Soviet army officer and Hero of the Soviet Union. He fought against Nazi Germany. He was a recipient of the Order of Lenin and the Order of the Red Star.

he destroyed 15 tanks with AT grenades. he died by shrapnel near  Seelow Heights .

1925 births
1945 deaths
Soviet military personnel killed in World War II
Heroes of the Soviet Union
Recipients of the Order of Lenin
Recipients of the Order of the Red Star